Karen Lea Wynn Fonstad (April 18, 1945 – March 11, 2005) was an American cartographer and academic who designed several atlases of fictional worlds, including her 1981 The Atlas of Middle-earth about J. R. R. Tolkien's creations.

Early life and education

Born Karen Lea Wynn in Oklahoma City, Oklahoma to parents James and Estis Wynn, she graduated from Norman High School in Norman, Oklahoma, and then earned a B.S. degree in Physical Therapy and an M.A. in Geography, specializing in cartography, from the University of Oklahoma. While attending the University of Oklahoma she met Todd A. Fonstad. They married in 1970, and had two children.

Career

Before her "retirement" to raising children and writing companion atlases, Fonstad was Director of Cartographic Services at the University of Wisconsin–Oshkosh. Her formal acknowledgments for The Atlas of Pern (1984) include "my husband, Todd, associate professor geography" and the UW Oshkosh Department of Geography. She served on the Oshkosh City Planning Commission for twenty-four years and was a member of the Oshkosh Common Council. Other interests and activities included the Grand Opera House Board of Directors, Hotel/Convention Center and Mass Transportation Center Development Committees, Oshkosh Commercial Development Corporation, Business Improvement Council Board of Directors, Downtown Oshkosh Committee, the Oshkosh Symphony League, the Camp Fire and Cub Scout programs, and the UW-Oshkosh Faculty Dames, where she held the offices of president and secretary.

Death
Karen Wynn Fonstad died, aged 59, from complications of breast cancer.

Works
Fonstad's speciality was the creation of fictional atlases:
 The Atlas of Middle-earth (1981) 
 Middle-earth, based on Tolkien's legendarium
The Atlas of Pern (1984) 
Pern, based on the Dragonriders of Pern series by Anne McCaffrey
The Atlas of the Land (1985) 
The Land, based on The Chronicles of Thomas Covenant by Stephen R. Donaldson
The Atlas of the Dragonlance World (1987) 
Krynn, based on the DragonLance stories by Tracy Hickman and Margaret Weis (among others)
The Forgotten Realms Atlas (1990) 
The Forgotten Realms, a setting for Dungeons & Dragons designed by Ed Greenwood, published by TSR
 The Atlas of Middle-earth: Revised Edition (1992)

References

External links
 
 

1945 births
20th-century cartographers
2005 deaths
American cartographers
American Methodists
Artists from Oklahoma City
Deaths from breast cancer
People from Norman, Oklahoma
Place of death missing
Role-playing game artists
Tolkien studies
University of Oklahoma alumni
University of Wisconsin–Oshkosh faculty
Women cartographers